Stefan Likić (Srem, c. 1680 - Slavonia, c. 1750) was a Serbian graphic artist and master woodcarver from the first half of the 18th century. His work is on display in the Serbian Orthodox Church Museum in Belgrade.

Stefan Likić was a priest and an artist—a master in woodcuts—who worked for churches and monasteries, including Lepavina Monastery, in Slavonia during the height of the Habsburg Empire. Many icons were attributed to him; Deesis of Saint Simeon and Saint Sava (1712);
Antimension of Christ with the Apostles (1724); and two-sided woodcut representing St. Nicholas and St. John the Baptist (1732).

See also
 List of painters from Serbia

References 

1680s births
1750s deaths
Serbian woodcarvers
People from Śrem
Serbian Orthodox clergy